Burns Lake station is on the Canadian National Railway mainline in Burns Lake, British Columbia. The station is served by Via Rail's Jasper – Prince Rupert train.

References

External links 
Via Rail Station Description

Via Rail stations in British Columbia